Vernie Merze Tate (February 6, 1905 – June 27, 1996) was a professor, scholar and expert on United States diplomacy. She was the first African-American graduate of Western Michigan Teachers College, first African-American woman to attend the University of Oxford, first African-American woman to earn a Ph.D. in government and international relations from Harvard University (then Radcliffe College), as well as one of the first two female members to join the Department of History at Howard University.

Early life

Tate was born February 6, 1905, in rural Rolland Township, Michigan. Her great-grandparents had migrated to Michigan from Ohio after receiving land through the Homestead Act.

She began attending Rolland Township Elementary School Number Five, which was located on land owned by her family. At age 13 she entered Blanchard High School. This high school was destroyed by fire and students had to attend makeshift classrooms in area buildings. Due to inadequate educational facilities, students graduated at the end of the tenth grade. Merze Tate was the youngest and only African-American graduate in her class and was selected valedictorian.

This, however, was unsatisfactory for college entrance, so she enrolled in Battle Creek High School where she maintained a straight-A average. As she was only enrolled in the school for two years she could not be class valedictorian. She did win the Hynman Oratorical Contest which included an award of $50. After graduation Merze applied to Western State Teachers College (now Western Michigan University) and was awarded a tuition scholarship.

Higher education and career

After completed the teacher's training program at Western Michigan Teacher's College, Tate taught at an elementary school in Cass County. During this time she continued her education by taking correspondence courses and returned to Western Michigan to complete her Bachelor of Arts degree in three years  while maintaining the highest grade average of her classmates. In 1927, she became the first African-American to earn a bachelor's degree from the institution. She also elected to the national social science honor society.

Despite her excellent academic career, Tate could not find employment in the state.  At that time, Michigan would not hire African American teachers in its secondary schools.  Tate received assistance from administrators at Western Michigan and was able to find a teaching position at Crispus Attucks High School in Indianapolis, Indiana. Whilst teaching, Tate took a part-time master's degree at Columbia. In 1932, she won an Alpha Kappa Alpha scholarship to study at Oxford University where she took a B.Litt. in International Relations in 1935. She matriculated as a Home Student of St Anne's College, and was the first African-American woman member of Oxford University. Subsequently, she gained a Ph.D. from Harvard University.

In 1936, she became the history and social science department chairman at Bennett College for women, also in North Carolina, where she taught four years. She also spent a year at what is now Morgan State University, where she taught political science and was dean of women, before joining the faculty of Howard University.

Later in her life, she was a world traveler and international correspondent for an African-American publication. She visited the White House annually (including meetings with Eleanor Roosevelt) and attended the 1932 Summer Olympics in Los Angeles. Later, she served as a Fulbright Scholar to India from 1950 to 1951.

In 1964, she published an analysis of the effect of nuclear testing on the inhabitants of the Marshall Islands.

Tate designed and secured patents for a refrigerator mixing unit.

Publications
"Australia and Self-Determination for New Guinea." The Australian Journal of Politics and History 17 (August 1971): 246–59.
"Recent Constitutional Developments in Papua and New Guinea." Pacific Affairs 44 (Fall 1971): 421–27.
The United States and the Hawaiian Kingdom: A Political History (New Haven, 1965)
The United States and Armaments (Cambridge: Harvard University Press, 1948)
The Disarmament Illusion: The Movement for a Limitation of Armaments to 1907 (New York:MacMillan ad Co., 1942)
Hawaii: Reciprocity Or Annexation ( Michigan State University Press, 1968)
"Slavery and Racism as Deterrents to the Annexation of Hawaii, 1854-1855," Journal of Negro History 47, no.1 (January 1962): 1–18.
"The War Aims of World War I and World War II and Their Relation to the Darker Peoples of the World".  The Journal of Negro Education, Vol. 12, Summer 1943: 521–532.

Awards and honors

American Historical Association Award for Scholarly Distinction, 1991
Inducted into Michigan Women's Hall of Fame, 1991
Distinguished Alumnus Award, American Association of State Colleges and Universities, 1981
Distinguished Alumni Award, Western Michigan University, 1970
Graduate Society Award, Harvard and Radcliffe, 1954

Legacy
The Merze Tate Prize for Best Article in Historical International Relations is awarded by the International Studies Association
 The Merze Tate Award for the best doctoral dissertation in the field of international relations, law, and politics is presented annually by the American Political Science Association
 The Merze Tate Explorers began in 2008 as a project to provide additional skills to girls in grades 6-12. It was founded by Sonya Bernard-Hollins.
 The Merze Tate Grant and Innovation Center in Western Michigan University’s College of Education and Human Development
 Merze Tate Student Education Endowment Fund at Western Michigan University started with a $1 million donation from Tate herself
 The Merze Tate Room, in Oxford's Faculty of History building, is named in her honour.

Notes

References
 
Visions and Decisions: Proceedings of the Annual Meeting of the American Association of State Colleges and Universities
 Cosner, Shaaron and Jennifer Scanlon. American Women Historians, 1700s-1990s: A Biographical Dictionary
 Vitalis, Robert. White World Order, Black Power Politics: The Birth of American International Relations. Cornell University Press (2015); accessed May 24, 2017.

External links
 Full online text of "The Disarmament Illusion: The Movement for a Limitation of Armaments to 1907"
Biography of Merze Tate, oldsettlersreunion.com; accessed May 24, 2017.

1905 births
1996 deaths
20th-century American educators
African-American academics
Howard University faculty
Radcliffe College alumni
Western Michigan University alumni
People from Isabella County, Michigan
20th-century African-American educators